Uglovaya is a rural locality (a village) in Andreyevskoye Rural Settlement, Vashkinsky District, Vologda Oblast, Russia. The population was 8 as of 2002.

Geography 
Uglovaya is located 27 km north of Lipin Bor (the district's administrative centre) by road. Andreyevskaya is the nearest rural locality.

References 

Rural localities in Vashkinsky District